The 66th David di Donatello ceremony, presented by the Accademia del Cinema Italiano, honored the best in Italian cinema released from 1 March 2020 to 28 February 2021. The ceremony was hosted by presenter Carlo Conti and was held in two venues, Teatro dell'Opera di Roma and Fabrizio Frizzi Television Studios, both in Rome.

Drama film Hidden Away won seven awards, including Best Film, out of fifteen nominations. Other winners included Miss Marx and Rose Island with three, Tolo Tolo with two, 18 Presents, 1917, Anne, Bad Tales, Citizens of the World, Hammamet, Kidz, The Life Ahead, My Name Is Francesco Totti, and The Predators with one.

Winners and nominees

Winners are listed first, highlighted in boldface, and indicated with a double dagger (‡). The nominations were announced on 26 March 2021.

Films with multiple nominations and awards

References

External links

David di Donatello
2020 film awards
2021 film awards
May 2021 events in Italy